Whifflet is now a suburb of Coatbridge, Scotland, which once formed its own distinctive village. It is referred to locally as 'The Whifflet' (and pronounced whiff-lit). Presently located in the North Lanarkshire Council area it was originally known as wheat flats (hence the vernacular pronunciation) but over time the name appears to have developed into Whifflet. It is dominated by its main street, Whifflet Street, which has many shops including an old sweet shop Tommy Tangos, pubs and bookmakers and is towered over by the post-war built Calder flats. The two most prominent tower blocks are on Whifflet St.

Whifflet is an area of Coatbridge which, historically, has been the centre of a lot of mining activity. One of the Whifflet pits in the 19th century reached a depth of 330 feet underground.

Albion Rovers football club was originally based in the Whifflet area at Meadow Park.

Notable residents have included Jock Cunningham a Coatbridge miner, mutineer and brigade commander on the republican side during the Spanish Civil War who lived at number 77b Whifflet Street.

In 1968, Robert Plant and John Bonham, before forming Led Zeppelin, did a Scottish tour with group Band of Joy in which they played the Marion Hall in Whifflet.  Thomas McAleese, alias Dean Ford was born and lived there and went on to achieve worldwide success with The Marmalade.

Whifflet has a 400-metre long former rail tunnel, now sealed, running south from the Calder Street traffic lights.

Whifflet railway station provides travel links to Glasgow, Motherwell, Coatbridge, and Cumbernauld.

Whifflet is said to have a particularly large Irish influence dating back to the early 20th century.

References

External links

Coatbridge
Neighbourhoods in North Lanarkshire